Futebol Clube Santa Cruz is a Brazilian football club from Santa Cruz do Sul, Rio Grande do Sul, founded on March 26, 1913. Its rival is Esporte Clube Avenida.

Achievements

 Campeonato Gaúcho Second Level:
 Runners-up (2): 1952, 1983

Copa FGF
 Winners (1): 2020

Current squad

References

Association football clubs established in 1913
Football clubs in Rio Grande do Sul
1913 establishments in Brazil